Robert James Dawson (born 3 January 1921) is a former Australian rules footballer who played with St Kilda in the Victorian Football League (VFL). Dawson came from Elmore and spent just one year at St Kilda, playing four games in the 1941 VFL season. The following year he enlisted in the Australian Army and served overseas during the war. He had considerable success in country football, with best and fairest awards in three different Victorian leagues. In 1946, the same year he returned from the war, he played for Elmore in the Bendigo Football League and won the Michelsen Medal. He then coached Tongala in the Goulburn Valley Football League, where he was awarded a Morrison Medal in 1950. He turned 100 in 2021.

References

1921 births
Living people
Australian rules footballers from Victoria (Australia)
St Kilda Football Club players
Tongala Football Club players
Australian Army personnel of World War II
Australian Army soldiers
Australian centenarians
Men centenarians